Mike Sosene-Feagai (born 17 April 1993) is a rugby union player who currently plays hooker for Old Glory DC of Major League Rugby (MLR). He was born in Samoa and raised in New Zealand, and now lives in the United States and plays internationally for the United States national rugby union team.

He previously played for Auckland rugby union team in the Mitre 10. In August  2021, he signed a temporary contract with Toulon to cover an injury to Christopher Tolofua.

References

1993 births
Living people
Sportspeople from Apia
Samoan rugby union players
New Zealand rugby union players
American rugby union players
Samoan emigrants to New Zealand
New Zealand emigrants to the United States
University of Waikato alumni
San Diego Breakers players
United States international rugby union players
Ohio Aviators players
Hawke's Bay rugby union players
Auckland rugby union players
Old Glory DC players
RC Toulonnais players
Rugby union hookers